Jaghori, is a major tribe of Hazara people in Afghanistan, who mostly inhabit in Jaghori District of Ghazni Province. Some Jaghori Hazaras also live in Pakistan they form the majority of the Hazaras in Quetta.

Divisions 
Hazara researcher Muhammad Isa Gharjistani identified four major branches of the Jaghori in 1989:  the Baighani (or Ata), Yazdari (Ezdari), Baghocari, and the Gari.

History 
The Jaghori are referenced in 1881 CE as being led by a Chief Safdar Ali, and it is noted that they had received a khillit and been conciliated by Amir Abdur Rahman.

In the Hazara Pioneers, the Hazara unit in the British army was raised in 1904 by Major Claude Jacob (Later Field Marshal Sir Claude Jacob) in Quetta, British Balochistan Agency. Its class composition had two out of four companies comprising Jaghoris.

Famous people from Jaghori Hazaras 
 Sardar Yazdan Khan
 General Musa Khan Hazara
 Muhammad al-Fayadh
 Akram Yari
 Sima Samar
 Shah Gul Rezai
 Younus Changezi
 Mohsin Changezi

See also 

 List of Hazara tribes
 Hazara people
 Jaghori District

References 

Hazara tribes
Ethnic groups in Ghazni Province